Gavialimimus is an extinct genus of plioplatecarpine mosasaur from the Maastrichtian of Morocco. The holotype MHNM.KHG.1231, an articulated skull and associated fragmentary postcrania, was found in the Ouled Abdoun Basin.

The etymology of this genus means "gharial mimic" (Hindi Gavial = "gharial" + Greek mimus = "mimic"). The genus name refers to morphological convergence between Gavialimimus and the extant gharial (Gavialis gangeticus). Gavialimimus has been said to occupy the niche of a large piscivore. In this way, through severe specialization, it managed to co-exist with several other large mosasaur species in the same area.

References 

Mosasaurids
Mosasaurs of Africa
Fossil taxa described in 2020